Nicolae Bălcescu may refer to several places in Romania, all named in honour of the 1848 revolutionary Nicolae Bălcescu:

 Nicolae Bălcescu, Bacău, a commune in Bacău County
 Nicolae Bălcescu, Călărași, a commune in Călărași County
 Nicolae Bălcescu, Constanța, a commune in Constanța County
 Nicolae Bălcescu, Vâlcea, a commune in Vâlcea County
 Nicolae Bălcescu, a village in Vărădia de Mureș Commune, Arad County
 Nicolae Bălcescu, a depopulated village in Scorțaru Nou Commune, Brăila County
 Nicolae Bălcescu, a village in Coțușca Commune, Botoșani County
 Nicolae Bălcescu, a village in Alexandru Odobescu Commune, Călărași County
 Nicolae Bălcescu, a village in Călmățuiu Commune, Teleorman County
 Nicolae Bălcescu, a village in Nalbant Commune, Tulcea County
 Nicolae Bălcescu, a district in the town of Flămânzi, Botoșani County
 Nicolae Bălcescu, a district in the town of Vânju Mare, Mehedinți County